Cadaver  is a 2022 Indian Tamil-language police procedural thriller film  directed by Anoop Panicker and written by Abhilash Pillai. The film was under Production House Amala Paul Productions. The film stars Amala Paul with Riythvika,  Munishkanth, Thrigun, Harish Uthaman and Athulya Ravi in supporting roles. The film's music is composed by Ranjin Raj with cinematography handled by Aravind Singh and editing done by San Lokesh. The film was released in Disney+ Hotstar on 12 August 2022.

Plot 
The film starts off with a mystery man abducting and cruelly murdering a chief heart surgeon Salim Rahman, of a reputed JC hospital in the city. As the case proceeds, we are introduced to Bhadra Thangavel, an expert pathologist, who aids the city's ACP Vishal in handling the case. Alongside, we also witness a prisoner, Vetri in prison, who had already vowed to kill the same surgeon by drawing his portrait on the walls of his cell. As this news leaks out, the commissioner and the pathologist are left with no choice, but to interrogate Vetri.

Despite being in captivity, Vetri manages to kill his second target just as he vowed. This shocks the entire city and they realise someone is helping him from the outside. Later, the whole film revolves around the Vetri and his late wife Angel and their connection to there case. Angel was actually pregnant at that time of her death and the autopsy done was none other than Salim Rahman, itself. Bhadra raises a question with Vishal that why does a heart surgeon need to conduct an autopsy of Angel, as her cause of death was due to blood loss from her head. That is when they find out that something is fishy with the autopsy. Angel's autopsy has never been done and her heart is missing.

Vishal is transferred to another city and Bhadra thinking over the case. It is then revealed that Bhadra met Angel before on a bus. She was returning back from a village to Vetri. Angel shows a locket to Bhadra in which she wants to keep miniature photos of her marriage with Vetri and their unborn child. After some days, Angel returns from hospital and meets with an accident due to chain snatching. She was severely injured. Vetri immediately takes her to a hospital where Salim Rahman works. It is shown that the baby was taken out from her womb and Salim Rahman removed her heart for transplantation into a rich patient body. A hospital nurse Priya takes away the baby for disposal only to find it crying suddenly. She takes the baby to her home and takes care of her.

Vetri thinking his wife and child are dead mourns for them. After a few days Bhadra finds Angel's body while teaching to students and finds a worker over there suspicious as he stares at Angel with grief. She questions him and finds out that he is Priya's father. He tells Bhadra about what had happened. She asks Priya's help in exposing the crimes. Initially afraid, Priya decides to serve justice for Angel. She sneaks into Salim's office but Salim finds her and attacks her with his father and Abel. Priya though wounded helps Bhadra by telling the names of persons who are responsible for Angel's death but succumbs to her injuries. Bhadra teams up with the church father and Priya's father to expose the crime to the society. The Church father guides Vetri about what to do, who is then in prison.

All the murders are not actually done by Vetri, but  Bhadra. She punishes everyone according to the punishments given in puranas. Soon proper investigation is opened and the crime is exposed. Vetri now free from all charges talks with Bhadra about his life ahead as his wife and child are dead. Bhadra gives Vetri a locket which he opens and finds his and Angel's picture with the picture of Bhadra's daughter. The locket was actually the one Angel wanted to gift Vetri. Bhadra takes in the baby after Priya's death and raises her as her own. Vetri hugs his daughter with emotion. It is shown after a few days that students are afraid to conduct autopsy over a dead body and Bhadra talks about the Cadaver (dead corpse) being humiliated by not conducting autopsy on it. It is revealed that the body is of Ali Rahman's and the screen cuts black.

Cast 

 Amala Paul as Dr. Badra Thangavel
 Harish Uthaman as ACP Vishal IPS
 Munishkanth as Inspector Michael
 Riythvika as Priya 
 Thrigun as Vetri 
 Athulya Ravi as Angel
 Ravi Prakash as Doctor Salim Rahman
 Nizhalgal Ravi as Dr. Abraham Abel
 Velu Prabhakaran as Ali Rahman, Dr. Salim Rahman's father
 Vinod Sagar

Production 
The film's shoot started in 2019. The film was earlier planned to release in theatres, but it was released directly on Disney+ Hotstar.

Release 
The film had an OTT release on 12 August 2022. A critic from The Hindu noted that "Cadaver sets up the milieu and its characters quite well". A reviewer from the Times of India opined that "Cadaver is thrilling in parts". A reviewer from IndiaToday wrote that  "Sincere Amala Paul fails to save bland investigative thriller".

References

External links 

2022 thriller films
Disney+ Hotstar original films
Indian thriller films